The following articles list tennis records and statistics:


General

Grand Slam 
 Grand Slam
 List of Grand Slam–related tennis records
 List of Grand Slam mixed doubles champions
 List of quad wheelchair tennis champions
 List of Open Era Grand Slam champions by country
 List of Grand Slam singles champions by country
 List of Grand Slam singles champions in Open Era with age of first title

Other 
 ITF rankings
 ITF World Champions
 List of tennis players career achievements
 Tennis players with most titles in the Open Era
 List of highest ranked tennis players per country
 List of Olympic medalists in tennis
 List of tennis rivalries
 Longest tennis match records &  Shortest tennis match records
 Longest tiebreaker in tennis
 Fastest recorded tennis serves
 Ace & Double fault
 Bagel & Golden set

Men's tennis

Grand Slam 
 Chronological list of men's Grand Slam tennis champions
 List of Grand Slam men's singles champions
 List of Grand Slam men's doubles champions
 List of Grand Slam boys' singles champions
 List of Grand Slam boys' doubles champions
 List of men's wheelchair tennis champions
 List of Grand Slam men's singles finals
 Tennis performance timeline comparison (men)
 Major professional tennis tournaments before the Open Era

Other 
 All-time tennis records – Men's singles
 Open Era tennis records – Men's singles
 Tennis male players statistics
 World number 1 ranked male tennis players
 Top ten ranked male tennis players
 Top ten ranked male tennis players (1912–1972)
 Tennis Masters Series singles records and statistics
 Tennis Masters Series doubles records and statistics
 List of Davis Cup champions

ATP 
 ATP Tour records
 ATP rankings
 List of ATP number 1 ranked singles tennis players
 List of ATP number 1 ranked doubles tennis players
 List of ATP Tour top-level tournament singles champions
 List of ATP Tour top-level tournament doubles champions
 ATP Awards
 ATP Finals appearances
 ATP Cup champions

Women's tennis

Grand Slam 
 Chronological list of women's Grand Slam tennis champions
 List of Grand Slam women's singles champions
 List of Grand Slam women's doubles champions
 List of Grand Slam girls' singles champions
 List of Grand Slam girls' doubles champions
 List of women's wheelchair tennis champions
 List of Grand Slam women's singles finals
 Tennis performance timeline comparison (women)
 Tennis performance timeline comparison (women) (1884–1977)

Other 
 All-time tennis records – Women's singles
 Open Era tennis records – Women's singles
 World number 1 ranked female tennis players
 Top ten ranked female tennis players
 Top ten ranked female tennis players (1921–1974)
 List of Billie Jean King Cup champions
 WTA 1000 Series singles records and statistics
 WTA 1000 Series doubles records and statistics

WTA 
 WTA Tour records
 WTA rankings
 List of WTA number 1 ranked singles tennis players
 List of WTA number 1 ranked doubles tennis players
 List of WTA Tour top-level tournament singles champions
 List of WTA Tour top-level tournament doubles champions
 WTA Finals appearances
 WTA Awards